The 2013 Soweto Open was a professional tennis tournament played on hard courts. It was the fourth edition of the tournament which was part of the 2013 ATP Challenger Tour and the 2013 ITF Women's Circuit. It took place in Johannesburg, South Africa, on 29 April – 5 May 2013 for the men's event and 6–12 May 2013 for the women's event.

ATP singles main-draw entrants

Seeds

 1 Rankings as of 22 April 2013

Other entrants
The following players received wildcards into the singles main draw:
  Wayne Montgomery
  Ruan Roelofse
  Tucker Vorster
  Dean O'Brien

The following players received entry using protected rankings:
  Prakash Amritraj
  Richard Becker

The following players received entry from the qualifying draw:
  Rafael Camilo
  Tyler Hochwalt
  Purav Raja
  Divij Sharan

The following player received entry as a lucky loser:
  Phenyo Matong

ATP doubles main-draw entrants

Seeds

1 Rankings as of 22 April 2013

Other entrants
The following pairs received wildcards into the doubles main draw:
  Francois Kellerman /  Okkie Kellerman
  Renier Moolman /  Dean O'Brien
  Keith-Patrick Crowley /  Tucker Vorster

WTA singles main-draw entrants

Seeds

 1 Rankings as of 29 April 2013

Other entrants
The following players received wildcards into the singles main draw:
  Madrie le Roux
  Zanmarie Pienaar
  Ilze Hattingh
  Natasha Fourouclas

The following players received entry from the qualifying draw:
  Julia Glushko
  Ani Vangelova
  Claudia Coppola
  Fadzai Mawisire

WTA doubles main-draw entrants

Seeds

Champions

Men's singles

 Vasek Pospisil def.  Michał Przysiężny 6–7(7–9), 6–0, 4–1, retired

Women's singles

 Tímea Babos def.  Chanel Simmonds 6–7(3–7), 6–4, 6–1

Men's doubles

 Prakash Amritraj /  Rajeev Ram def.  Purav Raja /  Divij Sharan 7–6(7–1), 7–6(7–1)

Women's doubles

 Magda Linette /  Chanel Simmonds def.  Samantha Murray /  Jade Windley 6–1, 6–3

External links
Official website

Soweto Open
Soweto Open
Soweto Open
Sow
Soweto Open
Soweto Open